Sir Peter Rigby DL  (born 29 September 1943) is a British entrepreneur. He is chairman and chief executive of Rigby Group PLC, and is one of Britain's richest people.

Career

Specialist Computer Centres
Peter Rigby founded SCC (Specialist Computer Centres) in 1975 with an initial cash investment of just £2,000. Rigby has maintained control of the company over 40 years of sustained growth  and has seen SCC's turnover rise to £2.038 billion (2005).

In May 2012, a company press release claimed that turnover to year end March 2012, had risen to £2.75billion, a 10% rise on the previous yearly period. Peter Rigby claims that if SCC were a public company, turnover would be as much as £14 billion.

SCC is now the largest privately owned technology company in Europe.

His sons, James Rigby (SCC CEO) and Steven Rigby (European GM) are both directors on the board of Rigby Group, while Peter Rigby is chairman and group CEO.

Other activities
In April 2010 Rigby's Patriot Aviation Group bought Coventry Airport, with a view to moving from freight-only to serving business passengers and helicopters. In June 2013 it bought Exeter International Airport. In June 2014 it bought Norwich International Airport, and in December 2017, Bournemouth Airport.

Rigby also owns the luxury hotel group Eden Hotel Collection, of which Mallory Court in Leamington was named "Most Excellent Hotel in the United Kingdom and Ireland" for 2009 by magazine Condé Nast Johansens.

Wealth
In 2010, the Sunday Times Rich List estimates Rigby to be worth £430m, based on his corporate investments. This ranked him as the 158th richest person in Britain. Although his net worth has increased through the acquisition of European IT companies, his position on the rich list has slipped from a peak of 61st in 2003.

The Birmingham Post also publishes a rich list of residents of the West Midlands; Rigby was at number 11 in 2017 with an estimated net worth of £850 million.

Honours
In 2000 Rigby was appointed Deputy Lieutenant of the West Midlands. He was knighted in the 2002 Birthday Honours "for services to information technology and to business in the West Midlands".

Notes

External links
SCC Group Homepage
Q&A with Sir Peter Rigby

Businesspeople in information technology
Businesspeople awarded knighthoods
English businesspeople
Knights Bachelor
1943 births
Living people
British chief executives
British chairpersons of corporations
Deputy Lieutenants of the West Midlands (county)